Fastenberg is a mountain in Saxony, Eastern Germany.

Mountains of Saxony
Mountains of the Ore Mountains